Murder Madness is a science fiction novel by American writer Murray Leinster.  It was first published in book form in 1931 by Brewer and Warren.  It was Leinster's first book.  The novel was originally serialized in four parts in the magazine Astounding SF beginning in May 1930.

Plot introduction
The novel concerns a tyrant who attempts to control civilization by using a madness-inducing drug.

Sources

External links 
 
 

1931 American novels
1931 science fiction novels
American science fiction novels
Novels first published in serial form
Works originally published in Analog Science Fiction and Fact
Novels by Murray Leinster